Hookagate and Redhill railway station was a station in Hook-a-Gate, Shropshire, England. The station was opened in 1911 and closed in 1933.

References

Further reading

Disused railway stations in Shropshire
Railway stations in Great Britain opened in 1911
Railway stations in Great Britain closed in 1933